Muslim privilege is a social advantage that is bestowed upon Muslims in historically Muslim societies. This arises out of the presumption that Muslim belief is a valid social norm, that leads to the marginalization of the nonreligious and members of other religions through institutional religious discrimination or religious persecution. Muslim privilege can also lead to the neglect of outsiders' cultural heritage and religious practices.

Muslim privilege first emerged during the Early Muslim conquests where non-Muslims were subject to Dhimmi status. In modern times Dhimmi restrictions have been mostly abolished, and most moderate Muslims see them as inappropriate for the modern age. Nonetheless, Muslims continue to have advantages over non-Muslims across the Islamic World. Positions of authority in the government and the military of countries where Islam is the state religion may require those holding them to be Muslim. For example, non-Muslims are not allowed to serve as judges (qadi).

Although sometimes actively promoted by Islamofascists and Islamists, Muslim privilege is often unintentionally perpetuated due to implicit biases.

As the Islamic world is large and culturally diverse, Muslim privilege manifests in different ways depending on the location. In Turkey, Muslim privilege (specifically Sunni) often overlaps with white privilege, while in Malaysia it is more linked to anti-Chinese and anti-Hindu sentiment.

Conspiracy theories about Muslim privilege are often used as justifications for Islamophobia across the world, from China to India to Europe.

See also 

 Dhimmi
 Dhimmitude
 Jizya
 Islam and other religions
 Islamic terrorism

References 

Islam and society
Rule by a subset of population
Critical theory
Social privilege
Religious discrimination
Islam and other religions